Ábrego is a Colombian municipality and town located in the department of Norte de Santander.

History 
The territory was inhabited by various indigenous communities such as the Oroques, Turmeros, Seborucos and Carasicas. The first denomination of this place was Llano de los Orejones in 1530 by Ambrosio Alfínger's troops. On July 26, 1580, a wooden cross was erected in the middle of the valley of this municipality for the first Eucharist, from that moment, the place began to be called "Llanos de la Cruz". The settlement of the municipality began when the sisters Ana María and Josefa de la Encarnación Maldonado Quintero donated several lands to raise the population of the municipality, from that moment they began to build streets and squares. March 12, 1810, is the date of the founding of the municipality. On April 14, 1930, by ordinance number 32, the name of the municipality was changed to Abrego, in order to honor the nortesantadereana woman who is considered a heroine in the department, Mercedes Abrego de Reyes.

Geography 
About 3 hectares of the municipality are located in the Santurbán moor, which is a water source for the departments of Norte de Santander and Santander. Part of the municipality is located in a valley between the Oroque and Frío rivers.

Climate

Economy 
The municipality's economy is based on agriculture, the main crop produced in the municipality is onions. Other products grown in Ábrego include tomatoes, cocoa, coffee, corn, beans, sugar cane and tobacco. In terms of commerce, in 2017, it was recorded that the municipality had 677 commercial establishments such as clothing stores, hairdressers, cafes or bakeries.

Heritage Sites 
Ábrego has several temples such as the Parish of Santa Bárbara, which is the first hermitage of the town completed in 1765, which was founded by Juan Quintero Príncipe and Cristóbal Arévalo. It became a parish on September 5, 1807, in which José María Fernández Carvajalino was the first parish priest. On December 31, 2003, by decree 1144, the church is considered a property of cultural interest of departmental character. Another temple in the municipality is the Divino Niño Church, which it was created by the parish priest Diógenes Sanabria, in 2009, the building was consecrated.

Another tourist attraction is the Pozo del Burro, in which according to a local legend, a traveler was traveling through this place with his donkey carrying gold, but he drowned in the river. In addition to Piedras Negras, which are a pile of stones scattered over approximately 3 hectares. Some theories suggest that they are of volcanic origin or that they are fragments of an asteroid, there is also an oral tradition that says that they were used by the Orokes for rituals in the nular phase.

Natural Reserves 
One of the natural reserves of Ábrego is the Juridiscciones Moor has about 2800 hectares, specifically in the Pan de Azúcar Lagoon, where the Oroque and Frío rivers are born, which form the Algodonal river. In December 2014, the Juridiscciones, Santurbán and Berlín Moors were delimited by resolution 2090, in this moor complex there are several lagoon, which are water sources for several municipalities of Norte de Santander, including Ábrego.

Education 
The first educational establishments in the municipality date back to 1844. The municipality has a mega school called Carlo Julio Torrado Peñaranda School which was inaugurated in 2016, the mega school has three computer rooms, physics, chemistry and biology laboratories, also in 2016, the school had 1600 primary and high school students studying in it. The municipality also has another school called Institución Educativa Colegio Santa Barbara, founded in 1966, in 2016, the 50th anniversary of the institution was celebrated in the main park of the municipality.

References 

Municipalities of the Norte de Santander Department
Populated places established in 1810
1810 establishments in the Spanish Empire